Thái Tổ is an imperial temple name typically used for Vietnamese emperors who founded a particular dynasty. The term was derived from the Chinese equivalent Tàizǔ. It may refer to:

Lý Thái Tổ (1009-1028), born Lý Công Uẩn, founder of the Lý dynasty
Trần Thái Tổ (1225-1234), born Trần Thừa, founder of the Trần dynasty
Lê Thái Tổ (1428-1433), born Lê Lợi, founder of the Lê dynasty
Mạc Thái Tổ (1527-1529), born Mạc Đăng Dung, founder of the Mạc dynasty
Nguyễn Hoàng (1558-1613), the first of the Nguyễn lords and an ancestor of the Nguyễn dynasty
Nguyễn Huệ (1753–1792), or the Quang Trung Emperor, second emperor of the Tây Sơn dynasty

See also 
 Gaozu (disambiguation) (similar meaning; some emperors have been called both)
 Taejo (disambiguation) (Korean equivalent)
 Taizu (disambiguation) (Chinese equivalent)

Temple name disambiguation pages